The Light Touch is a 1951 film starring Stewart Granger, Pier Angeli, and George Sanders, written and directed by Richard Brooks.

Plot
Art thief Sam Conride (Stewart Granger) steals a Renaissance-era painting on loan to an Italian museum by a Catholic church. He has been financed by his partner, Felix Guignol (George Sanders). Felix has an obsessed client named Aramescue (Kurt Kasznar) who has agreed to pay $100,000 for the artwork. However, Conride stages a boating accident on the way to the rendezvous in Tunis and tells Felix the painting has been destroyed in a fire.

Knowing that Sam is as unscrupulous and self-serving as he, Felix suspects otherwise. Nonetheless, he accepts Sam's suggestion that they create half a dozen forgeries to sell to unsuspecting art lovers. Felix recommends Anna Vasarri (Pier Angeli) as a painter good enough and poor enough to consider doing the work. When Sam approaches her, however, she is appalled and refuses, especially since the painting is believed by Catholics (and Aramescue) to work miracles. Felix tells Sam to get her to change her mind by romancing her. It works. She falls in love with him.

Meanwhile, Sam contacts R. F. Hawkley (Larry Keating), one of the few art fences capable of selling the famous painting. After his forgery expert, MacWade (Rhys Williams), confirms that the work is genuine, he agrees to pay $100,000. However, he does not have that much money with him, and Felix learns of their meeting.

Sam and Anna get married and travel to Italy for their honeymoon, financed by Felix. There, Anna learns by accident where her husband has hidden the real painting. Felix and his men watch and wait for Sam to meet Hawkley. On his own initiative, Charles (Mike Mazurki), one of Guignol's thugs, tries beating the information out of Anna, but she refuses to betray Sam.

Police officer Lt. Massiro tells her that if she knows where the real painting is, it must be returned, or he will arrest Sam. Anna asks for time to consider what to do. She then switches the painting with the fake that Sam had her create. When Sam shows Aramescu the painting, the man immediately spots it as a copy. Sam confronts Anna. When he discovers she has remained true to him despite being beaten, he comes to the realization she truly loves him, despite his many flaws, and that he loves her. Giving up, she reveals where the painting is hidden and leaves him.

Sam arranges for Massiro to arrest Felix and his men, though they have to be released when it is revealed that the painting they took from Sam is a forgery. However, this gives Sam the time he needs to return the work to its rightful place in the church. Anna returns to him as a result. As the couple walk away, arm in arm, Felix stops Charles from shooting his former partner.

Cast
 Stewart Granger as Sam Conride
 Pier Angeli as Anna Vasarri
 George Sanders as Felix Guignol
 Kurt Kasznar as Mr. Aramescu
 Joseph Calleia as Lt. Massiro
 Larry Keating as Mr. R. F. Hawkley
 Rhys Williams as Mr. MacWade
 Norman Lloyd as Anton, one of Felix's henchmen
 Mike Mazurki as Charles

Production
The original story by famous Broadway producer Jed Harris and Tom Reed was called "Crown of Thorns" and was purchased by MGM in April 1950 for $60,000. (The story has some resemblances to the real-life theft of the Mona Lisa.) Pandro S. Berman was assigned to produce.

The script was written by Richard Brooks, who also directed. This was Richard Brooks' second film as director. His first, Crisis, had starred Cary Grant and Grant was originally announced for the lead. Eventually the lead roles were signed to Stewart Granger and Pier Angeli, who had both just signed long-term contracts with MGM.

Granger had done location shooting for a movie Constable Pedley (which later became The Wild North) – filming on that was halted so Granger could make The Light Touch. George Sanders made the film as the first of a 3-picture deal with MGM.

Stewart Granger later wrote in his memoirs he had to make the film or go on suspension:
I wasn't particularly enamored of the thought of working with [Richard Brooks] as I had heard he had reduced a small-part actor to tears. That actor was Ramon Novarro. The thought of anyone reducing one of my childhood heroes to tears filled me with anger, but that's Hollywood. When a star is down he's fair game for anyone. I had to agree in order to avoid suspension and went along to meet Brooks. His opening words [were], 'I have to tell you that I wanted Cary Grant... [He then introduced the leading lady.]'That's Anna Maria Pierangeli who'll play opposite you. Doesn't speak very good English but we'll get round that.' I spoke very good English but wondered how the hell I would get round his dialogue.

Filming started April 1951 and took place on location in Taormina, Sicily, and Tunis, before returning to the MGM studios for two weeks.

Granger recalled, "Making The Light Touch was fairly uneventful and I knew as I made it that it would add nothing careerwise to anybody connected with it. Pier Angeli was adorable with an anxious mother in attendance at all times and Brooks was his apparently usual, unpleasant self.

Reception
According to MGM records, the movie earned $438,000 in the US and Canada and $843,000 internationally, leading to a loss of $406,000.

It recorded admissions of 10,277 in France.

References

External links
 
 
 
 

American crime drama films
American heist films
American romantic drama films
American black-and-white films
1950s English-language films
Films directed by Richard Brooks
Metro-Goldwyn-Mayer films
1951 romantic drama films
1951 crime drama films
1950s American films